Srikanth (19 March 1940 – 12 October 2021) was an Indian actor who has performed in around 200 Tamil films since his debut in 1965. He is also referred to as Venniradai Srikanth. He has played the lead hero in around 50 films between 1965 and 1979 and has also played supporting roles in films with actors Sivaji Ganesan, Muthuraman, Ravichandran and Jaishankar in the lead roles. In the late seventies to early nineties, he appeared as a villain opposite actors including Sivakumar, Rajinikanth and Kamal Haasan.

Film career  (1965–2009) 
Srikanth was employed in the American Consulate before his career in the film industry. Srikanth was given his break as the lead hero by C. V. Sridhar with the film Vennira Aadai in 1965. He used to act in various dramas staged by troupes between 1960 and 1965. His birth name was Venkatraman, however, he performed the character of Srikanth in Major Chandrakanth, a drama directed in 1962, due to which he gained popularity in drama circles. Later this same name was adopted while he entered into films. Srikanth along with Vietnam Veedu Sundaram, Nagesh, Vaali and Vennira Aadai Moorthy used to stay at the area near T. Nagar Club House near the Shiva Vishnu Temple. N. C. Chakravarthy, who was an assistant director to C. V. Sridhar, was a regular Table Tennis player at the T. Nagar Club House and approached Srikanth to give auditions at Chitralaya studios for the new Tamil film Vennira Aadai. The film Vennira Aadai introduced 4 new faces to Tamil Cinema including that of Srikanth, who were Jayalalithaa, Vennira Aadai Nirmala and Vennira Aadai Moorthy. He was the first male actor in Tamil films to act as lead hero opposite Jayalalithaa.

Later in 1965, Srikanth acted in Naanal, directed by K. Balachandar. He received his first negative role in the film Selva Magal in 1967. The image of a romantic hero which he acquired in his debut film, was used by him in only a few films in his career. Aiming for versatility, he accepted supporting roles in various films. He was in directorial ventures of K. Balachandar, like Bama Vijayam, Poova Thalaiya, Ethir Neechal, Navagraham and Nootrukku Nooru. He played the role of a mental patient in Raja Veetu Pillai, cast opposite Pushpalata. He played the hen-pecked husband who is son of the character played by Shivaji Ganesan in the film Vietnam Veedu. He has acted with Sivaji Ganesan in other films like Praptham, Gnana Oli, Vasantha Maligai, Rajapart Rangadurai, Sivagamiyin Selvan, Vani Rani, Thanga Pathakkam, Anbai Thedi, Rojavin Raja, Avan Oru Sarithiram, Ilaya Thalaimurai and Raja Rishi.

After success of the film Selva Magal in 1967, directors started approaching him for even villain roles and some of his successful films in villainous roles since 1968 include Thanga Gopuram, Gnana Oli, Gomatha Engal Kulamatha, Vairam, Vasantha Maligai, Anbu Thangai and Vani Rani. Despite the success in films, he and Sowcar Janaki were part of drama troupes giving live performances in the evening or on weekends.

He was part of many comedy films throughout his career like Ethir Neechal, Bama Vijayam, Yaarukku Mappilai Yaro, Kasethan Kadavulada, Kasi Yathirai, Kai Naraya Kaasu, Athaiya Mamiya and Ilaya Thalaimurai. He played the false son of P. Bhanumathi in the film Edupa Kai Pillai in 1975.

In 1972, Srikanth played a villain in Aval, directed by A. C. Trilogchandar in which Sasi Kumar played as the protagonist and this altered his career by him choosing to play negative roles in the future. In Thanga Pathakkam, Srikanth was cast as Jagan, the rebellious son of S. P. Choudhry, played by Sivaji Ganesan. The movie was adapted from a stage-play in which Sivaji Ganesan had previously starred as S. P. Choudhry. In the original stage-play, Jagan kills his father. In Thanga Pathakkam S. P. Choudhry instead kills his son Jagan. His role in Thanga Pathakkam is considered among his best performances. The film boosted his popularity as a villain, after acclaimed acting alongside Sivaji Ganesan.

But, at the peak of his career as the villain, Srikanth surprised critics and audience alike by returning to romantic image in the 1974 film Raja Nagam, with the song "Devam Vedhamum" gaining immense popularity.

In the 1974 Tamil film Dikkatra Parvathi, which won the National Film Award for Best Feature Film in Tamil in 1975, Srikanth starred in the lead role. Jaishankar and Srikanth did many films together in the seventies as the producer-directors liked their combination. Together they did films including Ponuvandu, Idhayam Parakiradhu, Unnaithan Thambi, Pinju Manam and Palabishegam. Srikanth received the Tamil Nadu State Film Award for Best Actor for his performance in the film Karunai Ullam.

Srikanth has performed alongside other acclaimed actors including Gemini Ganesan, Jaishankar and R. Muthuraman during his career. He also worked with his juniors Kamal Haasan, Sivakumar and Rajinikanth after 1977, with himself as the main villain like in films Pennai Solli Kutrram Illai, Sadhurangam, Bairavi, Sattam En Kayil, Neeya, Uyaranthvangal, etc. He never got a chance to act with M. G. Ramachandran. Srikanth has worked under the directions of  A. C. Thirulogachander, K. Balachander, Muktha Srinivasan, C. V. Sridhar and A. Bhimsingh.

Srikanth was part of Jayalalithaa's film career right from her first Tamil film, Vennira Aadai in 1965 to her last Tamil film Nadhiyai Thedi Vandha Kadal in 1980. He played her brother in the 100th film of Jayalalithaa – Thirumangalyam. He played her step-son in Thanga Gopuram. He also played supporting roles in films with Jayalalithaa in lead roles including Jesus, Vairam, Anbu Thangai, Anbai Thedi and Kanavan Manaivi.His role in Mounam Sammadham (1989) as advocate was appreciated.

He acted in dramas in 1970s to 1980s with Sowcar Janaki, Muthuraman, Lakshmi and later even in 1990s with next generation. Annamalai Manram was popular drama.  He also starred in a weekly television series called Mangai opposite K. R. Vijaya in 1998 and later he did serial Akshaya, which was broadcast on Sun TV.

Personal life 
Srikanth’s only daughter is settled in the USA. He died on 12 October 2021 at the age of 81.

Selected filmography

Television

References

External links 

1940 births
2021 deaths
Indian male film actors
Tamil male actors
Male actors in Tamil cinema
Tamil Nadu State Film Awards winners
20th-century Indian male actors
21st-century Indian male actors
People from Erode district